Byomkesh Bakshi is an Indian fictional detective in Bengali literature created by Sharadindu Bandyopadhyay.

Byomkesh Bakshi may also refer to:

Byomkesh Bakshi (TV series), 1993 drama series
Byomkesh Bakshi (2010 film), Indian crime drama film
Byomkesh Bakshi (2015 film)

See also
Byomkesh Bakshi in other media, list of media that includes the character Byomkesh Bakshi
Detective Byomkesh Bakshy!, 2015 Hindi film